Silence Lies is a Canadian drama film, directed by Julie Hivon and released in 2010. The film stars Suzanne Clément as Viviane Langevin, a photographer who is starved for creative inspiration ever since being disowned by her brother Frédéric (Sébastien Huberdeau) following a family dispute, when she meets Guillaume (Maxime Dumontier), a troubled young man who reminds her strongly of her brother.

The cast also includes Sophie Cadieux, Benoît Gouin, Claude Prégent and Pascale Montpetit.

The film was shot in 2009, primarily in Anjou, and premiered in August 2010 at the Montreal World Film Festival.

The film received two Jutra Award nominations at the 13th Jutra Awards in 2011, for Best Actress (Clément) and Best Cinematography (Claudine Sauvé).

References

External links

2010 films
Canadian drama films
Films shot in Quebec
Films set in Quebec
Quebec films
French-language Canadian films
2010s Canadian films